Kaylan Jenna Marckese (born April 22, 1998) is an American professional soccer player who plays as a goalkeeper for Arsenal of the WSL.

College career
Marckese played for the Florida Gators between 2015 and 2018. She was named to the SEC All-Tournament team in 2017 and 2018.

Club career

Gotham FC, 2019
Marckese was selected with the 28th pick in the 2019 NWSL College Draft by Sky Blue FC (now known as Gotham FC).

Selfoss, 2020
In April 2020, Marckese signed for Selfoss. Marckese played 19 games and helped the team win the 2020 Icelandic Super Cup.

HB Køge, 2021–2022
In January 2021, Marckese signed for HB Køge. Marckese spent two seasons with the club as their starting goalkeeper, and helped the team win two successive Kvindeliga titles in 2020–21 and 2021–22.

She started all eight of HB Koge’s matches in the 2021–22 UEFA Women's Champions League. Marckese made 48 saves, the most by any goalkeeper in the competition.

Arsenal, 2022–present
On July 25, 2022, Marckese signed for Arsenal.

Honors
Selfoss
 Icelandic Super Cup: 2020
HB Køge
 Kvindeliga: 2020–21, 2021–22
Arsenal
 FA Women's League Cup: 2022–23

References

External links
 
 Florida Gators profile

1998 births
Living people
Soccer players from Florida
American women's soccer players
Women's association football goalkeepers
Florida Gators women's soccer players
NJ/NY Gotham FC players
NJ/NY Gotham FC draft picks
Arsenal W.F.C. players
Women's Super League players
HB Køge (women) players
Selfoss women's football players